Josef Bugl (born 24 December 1932) is a German politician of the Christian Democratic Union (CDU) and former member of the German Bundestag.

Life 
For the CDU, which he had joined in 1975, he was elected to the state parliament of Baden-Württemberg in 1976. There he represented the constituency of Mannheim I and was education policy spokesman for the CDU state parliamentary faction. From 1980 to 1987 he was a member of the German Bundestag.

Literature

References

1932 births
Members of the Bundestag for Baden-Württemberg
Members of the Bundestag 1983–1987
Members of the Bundestag 1980–1983
Members of the Bundestag for the Christian Democratic Union of Germany
Members of the Landtag of Baden-Württemberg
Living people